The PSL awards is an awards evening held to honour South African football players, coaches and officials. It is conferred by the National Soccer League. The PSL awards are given to people pertaining to the Premier Soccer League and National First Division.

Premier Soccer League

Footballer of the Year

The PSL Footballer of the Year awarded was inaugurated in 2008. 

2019 winner was Thembinkosi Lorch

Chairman's Award
SuperSport United – R100 00

Referee of the season

Assistant Referee of the season

Player of the season

Players' Player of the Season

Goalkeeper of the season

Coach of the season

Young Player

Goal of the season

Top Goalscorer

Telkom Knockout

Player of the Tournament

MTN8

Player of the Tournament

National First Division

Top Goalscorer

Player of the season

Nedbank Cup

Player of the Tournament

Most Promising Player

References

Premier Soccer League trophies and awards
Annual events in South Africa